The American red fox (Vulpes vulpes fulva) is a North American subspecies of the red fox. It is the largest of the true foxes and one of the most widely distributed members of the order Carnivora, occurring in North America. This subspecies is most likely the ancestor of the domesticated silver fox.

North American colonization and native status
Current literature discusses whether or not the red fox is native to North America, with some research suggesting that nearly all red fox populations in North America are not native.  Vulpes vulpes  is usually seen either as an exotic species introduced by Europeans during the colonization of the North American continent or as a hybrid between European and North American red foxes. While it is claimed that Vulpes vulpes fulva stems from a non-native population that spread westward from European introduction, a historical analysis of firsthand accounts does not support this claim.

Phylogeographical and genetic analysis of the American red fox suggests that red foxes first migrated to North America during the Illinoian glaciation (300,000 to 130,000 years before present) and spread southward. More recently, the Wisconsin glaciation (100,000 to 10,000 before present) separated the North American red fox population into two distinct areas. North American red foxes are genetically distinctive from their Eurasian counterparts. Despite claims of historical translocations from Europe, modern red fox populations in the United States' southeastern region have been shown to be native to North America.  DNA comparisons show that the eastern American red fox is closely related to native populations in Canada and the northeastern region of the United States and is, therefore, the result of natural range expansions and not an invasive species from Europe as was previously thought. Range expansions seen recently may be connected to anthropogenic landscape change and not the spread of exotic European populations.

The native status of the American red fox has been demonstrated by current research, which has important implications for management strategies. Previous classifications and taxonomic uncertainties frame populations of Vulpes fulva as a non-native invasive species that can cause declines in the populations of native species and in carrying capacities and can populate regions at higher densities. The identification of the origins of the North American red fox populations is crucial in conservation efforts aimed at native vs. non-native species.

Taxonomy
The North American red foxes have been traditionally considered either as subspecies of the Old World red foxes or subspecies of their own species, V. fulva. Due to the opinion that North American red foxes were introduced from Europe, all North American red foxes have been seen as conspecific with V. vulpes; however, genetic analyses of global red fox haplotypes indicates that the North American red foxes have been genetically isolated from the Old World populations for 400,000 years, prompting possible application of V. fulva to all North American red foxes. Castello (2018) has formalized treatment of Vulpes fulva as a separate species from the Old World Vulpes vulpes. In 2014, Mark J. Statham among others released a study that supports Vulpes fulva as a separate species from the Old World Vulpes vulpes. However, the American Society of Mammalogists considers V. vulpes to be the sole species, as splitting it into Old and New World forms would render the Old World vulpes paraphyletic.

Origin
Red foxes colonized the North American continent in two waves: before or during the Illinoian glaciation and during the Wisconsinan glaciation. Gene mapping demonstrates that red foxes in North America have been isolated from their Old World counterparts for over 400,000 years, thus raising the possibility that speciation has occurred. In the far north, red fox fossils have been found in Sangamonian deposits in the Fairbanks District and Medicine Hat. Fossils dating from the Wisconsian are present in 25 sites in Arkansas, California, Colorado, Idaho, Missouri, New Mexico, Tennessee, Texas, Virginia and Wyoming. Although they ranged far south during the Wisconsinan, the onset of warm conditions shrank their range toward the north and they have only recently reclaimed their former American ranges because of human-induced environmental changes. Genetic testing indicates two distinct red fox refugia exist in North America, which have been separated since the Wisconsinan. The northern (or boreal) refugium occurs in Alaska and western Canada and consists of the large subspecies V. v. alascensis, V. v. abietorum, V. v. regalis and V. v. rubricosa. The southern (or montane) refugium occurs in the sub-alpine parklands and alpine meadows of the Rocky Mountains, the Cascade Range and the Sierra Nevada and consists of the small subspecies V. v. cascadensis, V. v. macroura, V. v. necator and V. v. patwin. The latter clade has been separated from all other red fox populations since the last glacial maximum and may possess unique ecological or physiological adaptations.

Although European foxes (V. v. crucigera) were reported to have been introduced to portions of the United States in the 1900s, recent genetic investigation indicates an absence of European fox haplotypes in any North American populations. Also, introduced eastern American red foxes have colonized southern California, the San Joaquin Valley and the San Francisco Bay Area, but appear to have mixed with the Sacramento Valley red fox (V. v. patwin) only in a narrow hybrid zone. In addition, no evidence is seen of interbreeding of eastern American red foxes in California with the montane Sierra Nevada red fox (V. v. necator) or other populations in the intermountain West (between the Rocky Mountains to the east and the Cascade and Sierra Nevada Mountains to the west).

Subspecies
Usually named as subspecies of V. vulpes, Castelló recognized nine valid subspecies of V. fulva, as listed below:

Habitat

Vulpes vulpes fulva inhabits the entirety of Canada and most of the United States (east of the Rocky Mountains, except the southern Great Plains and southern Texas). The eastern American red fox generally prefers mixed vegetation communities that occur on edge habitats with a high level of diversity. In developed areas, the eastern American red fox will inhabit areas that offer a combination of woodland and agricultural land.

Diet, hunting, and feeding behavior
The American red fox has a primarily carnivorous diet dominated by small mammals. However, as an opportunistic species they will adopt an omnivorous diet that includes plants, fruits, berries, birds, insects and other small animals. Food sources can vary depending on region, but cottontail rabbits (Sylvilagus) are the most important prey for eastern American red foxes. The American red fox will consume larger animals as carrion and their diet changes depending on seasonal variability.

References

Sources

 

 
 

Vulpes
Mammals of North America